Jefferson Township is one of the sixteen townships of Brown County, Ohio, United States. The 2010 census found 1,433 people in the township, 872 of whom lived in the unincorporated portions of the township.

Geography
Located in the eastern part of the county, it borders the following townships:
Jackson Township - northeast
Byrd Township - southeast
Union Township - south
Pleasant Township - west
Franklin Township - northwest

The village of Russellville is located in northern Jefferson Township.

Name and history
It is one of twenty-four Jefferson Townships statewide.

Jefferson Township was established in 1853 from land given by Byrd Township.

Government
The township is governed by a three-member board of trustees, who are elected in November of odd-numbered years to a four-year term beginning on the following January 1. Two are elected in the year after the presidential election and one is elected in the year before it. There is also an elected township fiscal officer, who serves a four-year term beginning on April 1 of the year after the election, which is held in November of the year before the presidential election. Vacancies in the fiscal officership or on the board of trustees are filled by the remaining trustees.

References

External links
County website

Townships in Brown County, Ohio
1853 establishments in Ohio
Populated places established in 1853
Townships in Ohio